Spellow Lane Church is an Evangelical church in Walton, Liverpool, Merseyside, England.

References

Churches in Liverpool